Kao is a small lunar impact crater that is located near the eastern limb of the Moon. It lies near the southern edge of the Mare Smythii, a lunar mare that continues onto the far side of the surface. This crater lies to the east-southeast of the crater Widmannstätten. Less than a crater diameter to the north-northeast is the small crater Tucker.

This crater forms part of a merged pair with Helmert to the south. There is a gap in the sides of the crater where they are joined together, and they share a common floor that has been resurfaced by lava. The outer rim of this crater now forms little more than a shallow ring in the surface, with the rim lowest along the northern side. It is unmarked by impacts of significance. However, there is a small crater along the southeastern edge where the rim joins that of Helmert.

References

 
 
 
 
 
 
 
 
 
 
 
 

Impact craters on the Moon